Réservoir Saint-Michel is a lake in Finistère, France. At an elevation of 227 m, its surface area is 4.5 km².

Saint Michel
Landforms of Finistère